Suzanne Coupal was a justice with the Court of Quebec. She retired to become a painter, working full-time in her studio in Montreal. She is a graduate of the McGill University Faculty of Law, where she served as Circulations Editor for the McGill Law Journal.

References

Living people
Judges in Quebec
McGill University Faculty of Law alumni
Canadian women judges
Year of birth missing (living people)